Moskovsky District is the name of several administrative and municipal divisions in Russia. The districts are generally named for Moscow, the capital of Russia.

Districts of the federal subjects 

 Moskovsky District, Saint Petersburg, an administrative district of the federal city of Saint Petersburg

City divisions 
 Moskovsky City District, Cheboksary, a city district of Cheboksary, the capital of the Chuvash Republic
 Moskovsky Administrative District, Kaliningrad, an administrative district of the city of Kaliningrad, the administrative center of Kaliningrad Oblast
 Moskovsky Okrug, Kaluga, an okrug of the city of Kaluga, the administrative center of Kaluga Oblast
 Moskovsky City District, Kazan, a city district of Kazan, the capital of the Republic of Tatarstan
 Moskovsky City District, Nizhny Novgorod, a city district of Nizhny Novgorod, the administrative center of Nizhny Novgorod Oblast
 Moskovsky City District, Ryazan, a city district of Ryazan, the administrative center of Ryazan Oblast
 Moskovsky City District, Tver, a city district of Tver, the administrative center of Tver Oblast

See also 
 Moskovsky (disambiguation)
 Moscow District (disambiguation)
 Moscow Okrug (disambiguation)
 Moscow (disambiguation)

References